Razzmatazz is a 1977–82 news and entertainment program aimed primarily for teen and young adult audiences. Airing in the U.S. on the CBS television network, it starred Barry Bostwick in the first season, and Brian Tochi from season two onward.

The show was a news magazine presenting filmed stories of children's activities, including a girl who raised a lioness in Louisville, and a group of kite-flying enthusiasts from Saratoga, New York.

A production of CBS News in association with Scholastic, Inc., the show was produced by Joel Heller and had the same production team as CBS's news other award-winning news programs for young people, In The News, What's It All About and 30 Minutes. The series was generally broadcast on a once-a-month basis, preempting the network program televised at 4 p.m. ET, or 3 p.m. in other time zones. As not all stations carry CBS programming at that time, carriage of Razzmatazz has varied, depending on the station's schedule.

References

External links
 

1970s American children's television series
1980s American children's television series
1977 American television series debuts
1982 American television series endings
American children's education television series
CBS original programming
Television series by CBS Studios
CBS News